Yuma station is an Amtrak station at 281 South Gila Street in Yuma, Arizona, United States. Passenger rail service is provided thrice-weekly in each direction by the Sunset Limited and the Texas Eagle over this portion of its route. The station's island platform, which is adjacent to the station building site, are accessible through a short pedestrian tunnel.

The former structure, the Southern Pacific Railroad Depot, was built in 1926 by the Southern Pacific Railroad. After SP ceased passenger operations upon Amtrak's start in 1971, the station housed the Yuma Fine Arts Museum. The depot was listed in the National Register of Historic Places in 1976. The structure was devastated in a May 1993 fire and was razed in the summer of 1994.

Schedule
There are three weekly trains in each direction:
 Westbound Train #1/421 departs at 11:49 pm Tuesday, Thursday and Sunday
 Eastbound Train #2/422 departs at 2:47 am Monday, Thursday and Sunday

Train #1 is the Westbound New Orleans-Los Angeles Sunset Limited, while train #421 refers to the through coach and sleeper transferred from the Texas Eagle (Chicago-San Antonio) to the Sunset Limited in San Antonio.

Train #2 is the Eastbound Sunset Limited, traveling from Los Angeles to New Orleans, with a through coach and sleeper designated as Train #422, which is detached in San Antonio and transferred to the Chicago-bound Texas Eagle #22.

References

External links

 Yuma Amtrak station information
 Yuma Amtrak Station (USA Rail Guide – Train Web)

Buildings and structures in Yuma, Arizona
Amtrak stations in Arizona
Transportation in Yuma County, Arizona